Deyatelnyy ("Active") was a Soviet Navy 1135 Burevestnik-class Large Anti-Submarine Ship (BPK) or Krivak-class frigate. Displacing  full load, the vessel was built around the Metel anti-submarine missile system. Launched on 6 April 1975, Deyatelnyy served with the Black Sea Fleet and, as well as Bulgaria in the Black Sea, spent the next two decades travelling as far as the Mediterranean Sea to visit ports in North Africa for cultural reasons and to improve relations between the Soviet Union and other nations, For example, in 1981, the ship was the first Soviet vessel for more than ten years to visit Libya. In 1987, the vessel was used to test a new missile for the Metel system that added anti-ship capability. The ship was taken out of service for repair and modernisation in 1991. However, lack of funding meant that, instead, Deyatelnyy was decommissioned on 10 June 1995 and broken up.

Design and development
Deyatelnyy was one of twenty-one Project 1135 Burevestnik ("Petrel") class ships launched between 1970 and 1981. Project 1135 was envisaged by the Soviet Navy as a less expensive complement to the Project 1134A Berkut A (NATO reporting name 'Kresta II') and Project 1134B Berkut B (NATO reporting name 'Kara') classes of anti-submarine warfare ships. The design was originally given to TsKB-340, which had designed the earlier Project 159 (NATO reporting name 'Petya') and Project 35 (NATO reporting name 'Mirka') classes. However, the expansion in the United States Navy ballistic missile submarine fleet and the introduction of longer-ranged and more accurate submarine-launched ballistic missiles led to a revisit of the project. The work was transferred to TsKB-53 in Leningrad who produced a substantially larger and more capable design. The design, created by N. P. Sobolov, combined a powerful missile armament with good seakeeping for a blue water role and shared the same BPK designation as the larger ships. This was amended to Guard Ship (SKR) from 28 July 1977 to reflect the change in Soviet strategy of creating protected areas for friendly submarines close to the coast. NATO forces called the new class 'Krivak' class frigates.

Power was provided by two M7 sets, each consisting of a combination of a  DK59 and a  M62 gas turbine combined in a COGAG installation and driving one fixed-pitch propeller. The ship’s complement was 197, including 23 officers.

Armament and sensors
Deyatelnyy initially had a primary mission of anti-submarine warfare and for this end was equipped with four URPK-3 Metel missiles (NATO reporting name SS-N-14 Silex), backed up by two quadruple torpedo tube mounts for  torpedoes and a pair of  RBU-6000 Smerch-2 anti-submarine rocket launchers. Defence against aircraft was provided by forty 4K33 OSA-M (SA-N-4 'Gecko') surface-to-air missiles which were launched from two sets of ZIF-122 launchers, each capable of launching two missiles. Two twin  AK-726 guns were mounted aft and two single mounts for  21-KM guns were carried on the superstructure. Provision was made for carrying 18 mines.

Deyatelnyy had a well-equipped sensor suite, including a single MR-310A Angara-A air/surface search radar, Volga  and Don-2 navigation radars, MP-401S Start-S ESM radar system and Spectrum-F laser warning system. An extensive sonar complex was fitted, including MG-332 Titan-2, which was mounted in a bow radome, and MG-325 Vega. The ship was also equipped with the PK-16 decoy-dispenser system.

Construction and career
Deyatelnyy was laid down by Zalyv Shipbuilding yard in Kerch on 21 June 1972, the third of the class to be constructed by the shipbuilder, and was given the yard number 13. The vessel was named for a Russian word which can be translated active or energetic. Launched on 6  April 1975 and commissioned on 25 December that year, the ship joined the Black Sea Fleet, serving in the Black Sea, Mediterranean Sea and Atlantic Ocean.

Amongst the first missions for the ship was a visit to Tunis, Tunisia, between 30 June and 4 July 1977, where the crew engaged in cultural exchange. This proved just one of many opportunities that the crew had to engage with cities outside the Soviet Union into the following decade. Between 25 and 30 July 1981, the ship was to be found in Tripoli, Libya. This was designed to improve international relations and was the first time that a Soviet vessel had visited the country since 1970 and led to many similar exchanges, improving the relationship between the two nations. After a main armament upgrade undertaken at Sevastopol Shipyard between 1984 and 1986, Deyatelnyy fired 24 of the new URPK-5 missiles off the coast of Feodosia against surface and underwater targets between March and June 1987. As well as travelling at a higher speed, the missile provided a new anti-ship capability for the class. Between 11 and 15 August 1989, the vessel spent time in Varna, Bulgaria.

In October 1991, Deyatelnyy sailed to Sevastopol to be repaired, and was there at the time of the dissolution of the Soviet Union on 26 December 1991 when the ship was to be transferred to the Russian Navy. However, lack of funding instead meant that the ship was decommissioned on 10 June 1995 and left Sevastopol to be broken up by a Turkish company on 6 April 1997.

References

Citations

Bibliography

 
 
 
 
 
 
 
 
 
 

1975 ships
Krivak-class frigates
Ships built at the Zalyv Shipbuilding yard
Ships built in the Soviet Union
Cold War frigates of the Soviet Union